The Tuolumne River  (Yokutsan: Tawalimnu) flows for  through Central California, from the high Sierra Nevada to join the San Joaquin River in the Central Valley. While the upper Tuolumne is a fast-flowing mountain stream, the lower river crosses a broad, fertile and extensively cultivated alluvial plain. Like most other central California rivers, the Tuolumne is dammed multiple times for irrigation and the generation of hydroelectricity.

Humans have inhabited the Tuolumne River area for up to 10,000 years. Prior to the arrival of Europeans, the river canyon provided an important summer hunting ground and a trade route between Native Americans in the Central Valley to the west and the Great Basin to the east. First named in 1806 by a Spanish explorer after a nearby indigenous village, the Tuolumne was heavily prospected during the California Gold Rush in the 1850s, and the lower valley was cultivated by American settlers over the next few decades. The city of Modesto grew up on the Tuolumne as a railroad hub, absorbing most of the population of the Tuolumne valley around the turn of the century. As agricultural production rose, farmers along the Tuolumne formed California's first two irrigation districts to better control and develop the river.

From the 1900s to the 1930s, the river was dammed at Don Pedro and Hetch Hetchy to provide water for Central Valley farmers and the city of San Francisco, respectively. The Hetch Hetchy project, located inside Yosemite National Park, incited national controversy, and has been described as having forged the modern environmental movement in the United States. As the mid-20th century progressed, demands on the Tuolumne continued to increase, culminating in the completion of New Don Pedro Dam in the early 1970s. These projects halved the amount of water flowing from the Tuolumne into the San Joaquin, greatly reducing the once-abundant runs of salmon and steelhead in both rivers.

Course

The Tuolumne originates in Yosemite National Park, high in the Sierra Nevada, as two streams. The  Lyell Fork rises at the Lyell Glacier below  Mount Lyell, the highest peak in Yosemite National Park, and flows north through Lyell Canyon. The  Dana Fork originates between Mount Dana and Mount Gibbs and flows west.

After the confluence of the forks in Tuolumne Meadows, the river meanders northwest, passing under Tioga Road. Although calm for the first few miles, this quickly changes as the river drops over Tuolumne Falls and White Cascades. After briefly passing through Glen Aulin, the river enters the spectacular  Grand Canyon of the Tuolumne, where it forms three more major waterfalls – California, LeConte and Waterwheel Falls. Return and Piute Creeks join the river from the north within the Tuolumne Canyon. At the end of the canyon the river widens into Hetch Hetchy Reservoir, formed by a dam built in 1923 to provide water to the city of San Francisco, in the scenic Hetch Hetchy Valley. Falls Creek forms Wapama Falls and Tueeulala Falls, two of the highest in Yosemite, as it enters the reservoir from the north.

Below the O'Shaughnessy Dam the Tuolumne passes Poopenaut Valley and enters a series of continuous canyons as it flows through the Sierra foothills, leaving the western boundary of Yosemite National Park and entering the Stanislaus National Forest. Most of the Tuolumne's main tributaries join within this reach, beginning with Cherry Creek from the north just below the intake of the Hetch Hetchy Aqueduct, which delivers water to San Francisco. The South Fork of the Tuolumne joins from the south a few miles downstream, near Groveland-Big Oak Flat, followed by the Clavey River from the north a few miles after that. The North Fork of the Tuolumne joins from the north near the upper end of Lake Don Pedro, which was formed in 1971 when the New Don Pedro Dam was built to provide hydroelectricity and irrigation water storage.

Highway 99 and the Southern Pacific Railroad tracks both cross the river in Modesto, and the Modesto Airport is located adjacent to the river shortly upstream. Dry Creek joins the Tuolumne from the north between the airport and the railroad.

Discharge

Although most of the flow in the river originates from summer snowmelt, massive floods can occur following heavy winter storms. The natural flow of the Tuolumne at the mouth is greatly reduced by diversions to both San Francisco's Hetch Hetchy municipal water system and the canals of the Modesto and Turlock irrigation districts.

The United States Geological Survey (USGS) operates, or has operated, several stream gages along the Tuolumne River. During the Great Flood of 1862, the river reached an estimated peak of  here, after a record  of rain fell in the Tuolumne River basin between November 11, 1861, and January 14, 1862, as recorded at Sonora. The gage was not in place during this time.

Watershed

Physiography
The Tuolumne River watershed can be divided into three distinct physiographic regions. From the headwaters to below Hetch Hetchy Reservoir, the river drains the Sierra highlands, which are characterized by solid, glacier-carved granitic bedrock, thin poor soils and areas of heavy forestation. Most of the snowpack that feeds the Tuolumne accumulates in this region. Streams are generally high-gradient, clear and rocky, but large alpine meadows provide riparian and wetland habitat, which contribute sediment to the watershed's runoff. There are also a large number of natural lakes and tarns in the upper watershed. The Sierra crest harbors a number of glaciers, including Lyell and Maclure Glaciers, the largest in Yosemite National Park. Melting ice feeds the upper reaches of the Tuolumne River, maintaining water flow in the late summer when many other streams in the region are dry. The Lyell Glacier is the second largest in the Sierra Nevada, after Palisade Glacier at the headwaters of Big Pine Creek a tributary of the Owens River. Both Lyell and Maclure glaciers have shrunk significantly since the late 1800s when measurements were first made.

Between Hetch Hetchy Reservoir and the upper end of Lake Don Pedro the Tuolumne flows through the Sierra foothills, where it has a lower gradient but continues to maintain a fast current. Stream pools and gravel bars figure more prominently in the channel, allowing the growth of riparian habitat. By the time the river reaches Lake Don Pedro it has accumulated almost 90 percent of its total flow as precipitation run-off, snowmelt and groundwater base flow. Below Don Pedro Dam the river flows across the large alluvial plain of the San Joaquin Valley, formed by millions of years of sediment deposits eroded from the Sierra. Historically this section of the river was subject to frequent course changes and formed thousands of acres of seasonal wetlands during the spring floods. Since the introduction of large-scale agriculture the Tuolumne River course has been fixed between an extensive system of levees.

About , or 34 percent, of the Tuolumne River watershed is inside Yosemite National Park. The rivers whose watersheds border that of the Tuolumne are the Stanislaus River and West Walker River in the north, the Merced River in the south, the East Walker River to the northeast, the Mono Lake basin (Mill Creek, Lee Vining Creek and Rush Creek) to the east, and the headwaters of the San Joaquin River proper to the southeast.

Tributaries
Major tributaries of the Tuolumne and pertinent data are listed in the below table. Order is from the headwaters downstream.

Land use
Almost 80 percent of the Tuolumne River watershed lies above New Don Pedro Dam and is primarily forested with some alpine, meadow and grassland zones. The primary land use in the lower Tuolumne River watershed is agriculture, but there are also significant urbanized areas. Although only about  (5.4 percent) of the watershed itself are farmed, river water is used to irrigate almost five times that area outside the watershed boundaries. About  (1.3 percent) of the watershed are urbanized, mostly in the Greater Modesto area. About 550,000 people inhabit the Tuolumne River watershed as a whole, with approximately 210,000 living in Modesto.

Engineering and flood control
Like most other Sierra Nevada rivers, the Tuolumne has been extensively dammed to provide flood control, water supply, and hydroelectric power. The uppermost dam is the O'Shaughnessy, which impounds the  Hetch Hetchy Reservoir, providing water and power to the City of San Francisco. The Hetch Hetchy hydroelectric system diverts large volumes of water into tunnels that feed two hydroelectric plants, the Kirkwood and the Moccasin. However, it also causes dewatering of significant portions of the Tuolumne River, especially during low water summers when all but a minimal fish release is diverted through the power plants. Not all of the flow used by the power plants is returned to the river. Due to the pristine quality of the water, the Hetch Hetchy system is one of only a few serving major cities in the United States that does not require filtration.

Cherry Creek, the Tuolumne's biggest tributary, is also part of the San Francisco hydroelectric system. Cherry Creek is dammed at the Cherry Valley Dam, which creates  Cherry Lake. A major tributary, Eleanor Creek, is dammed to form Lake Eleanor, and diverted into Cherry Lake through a tunnel. The combined flow is channeled into a penstock and returns to the river at the Holm Powerhouse. Unlike the Hetch Hetchy system, the Cherry Creek system is used exclusively for hydropower, not water supply, because the water quality is not quite as good. However, there is a connecting aqueduct that allows Cherry Lake to be tapped to supply the Hetch Hetchy system during severe droughts. This backup water supply was last used during late 2015, as a test to ensure its functionality should drought conditions become worse. The previous time it was used was 1988.

It replaced an earlier concrete dam built on approximately the same site. The Turlock and Modesto Irrigation Districts control the lion's share of water in the reservoir, although the City of San Francisco also has storage rights, which it uses mainly to offset the effects of water diverted upstream at Hetch Hetchy. Because of the desire to increase water storage for other uses, only  of the reservoir is designated flood control, which is relatively small compared to other reservoirs in California. As a result, Don Pedro frequently fills and spills during winter storms, causing damage downstream.

The La Grange Dam, a much smaller masonry diversion dam, is the last one on the Tuolumne before it joins with the San Joaquin. Modesto Canal, on the north side of the river, and Turlock Canal, on the south side, are both large irrigation diversions.

Below La Grange, the Tuolumne – much reduced due to irrigation diversions – flows through a fixed channel with a highly restricted floodplain. Before agriculture, the river inundated large areas of seasonal marshland and was free to change course during its frequent floods. The valley is dependent on flood control storage at Lake Don Pedro to prevent flows from exceeding the channel capacity. However, this has happened many times, most infamously during the New Year's Flood of 1997, during which inflows to Don Pedro hit , the largest recorded since the Great Flood of 1862.

Fish, plants and wildlife
The Tuolumne once supported large spring and fall runs of chinook salmon (king salmon, Oncorhynchus tshawytscha) and steelhead trout (Oncorhynchus mykiss). In its native state the fall Chinook run alone may have numbered as high as 130,000. With the exception of the Merced River immediately south, this is the southernmost existing population of Chinook salmon in North America. Massive irrigation diversions and river channelization projects have led to the extinction of the spring Chinook run and greatly reduced the fall run. Dams have blocked more than half of the original  of migratory fish spawning habitat in the Tuolumne River watershed. The San Joaquin River and the Sacramento–San Joaquin River Delta, which link the Tuolumne salmon runs to the Pacific, have also been affected by flow reduction and pollution. In addition, introduced species such as striped bass prey on juvenile salmon, consuming as much as 93 percent of smolt before they can migrate to the sea. A controversial proposal by the State Water Resources Control Board from around 2013 would require increased spring and summer flows on the Tuolumne River which would benefit native anadromous fish populations, but greatly reduce the water supply available for farms and cities. This has been countered by irrigation districts who maintain that the aforementioned predation, not low flows, are the primary cause of salmon smolt deaths.

Forests in the watershed are divided between several distinct zones. The foothill region is characterized by trees and plants adapted to a hot, dry climate, including chamise (greasewood), California lilac, manzanita, blue oak, interior live oak (Sierra live oak), and gray pine. The lower montane forests include black oak, ponderosa pine, incense cedar and white fir; higher up Jeffrey pine and western juniper appear. Above 9500 feet, only small shrubs, flowering plants and occasional whitebark pine populate the alpine zone, which is limited to the peaks around Tuolumne Meadows and along the Sierra Crest.

Humans have influenced natural conditions in the Tuolumne River watershed for centuries. Native Americans set controlled fires in grassland to clear out dead foliage, providing room for new growth which in turn attracted game animals to forage. They also periodically burned out oak woodland areas in the foothills to control pests, which otherwise would have affected their main food supply, acorns. During the Spanish and Mexican periods, the Central Valley was used for cattle ranching, which quickly decimated natural range grasses. During the 1880s American sheep ranchers brought their herds into the upper Tuolumne River watershed for summer pasture, which further damaged the range in the foothills and Sierras. Hetch Hetchy Valley was one of the main summer grazing areas for sheep. The decline of native perennial grasses caused invasive annual species to flourish, and also increased the susceptibility of the watershed to wildfires. In order to protect property and watershed quality, intensive fire suppression began in the early 20th century. However, this led to overgrowth and a disruption of the natural forest succession process that was previously driven by wildfires.

Early history
Estimates of the first human habitation along the Tuolumne River range from 3000 to 7000 BC. The Plains and Sierra Miwok, who were the largest regional Native American group immediately prior to European contact, first established themselves in the area around 1200 CE. The Miwok lived in the Sierra foothills and Central Valley lowlands during winter and traveled into the upper Tuolumne River in summer to hunt, as well as seek refuge from the summer heat. The Paiute, who inhabited the Great Basin on the east side of the Sierra, also ventured into the Tuolumne River basin during the summer. The Yokuts lived along the lower Tuolumne River and were not known to venture up into the Sierra during summer.

The chief meeting point of the Paiute and Miwok was the Hetch Hetchy Valley, rich in edible plants and game. The origin of the name "Hetch Hetchy" may have been a type of edible grass that grew in the valley, which native peoples made into grain and ground in stone mortars for meal.
They set controlled fires to clear out old vegetation in their gathering areas, allowing for more efficient harvesting of new growth. This would also increase the prevalence of grasses and ferns, attracting game animals such as deer, and made the landscape more easily navigable. Many of the landscapes in the Tuolumne River area encountered by the first European explorers were thus not pristine but the result of hundreds of years of management; indeed, the famous meadows of Hetch Hetchy Valley prior to its damming only existed because of the annual burn.

The origin of the Tuolumne River's name is unclear. The first recorded use of the name "Tuolumne" was by the Spanish explorer Gabriel Moraga in 1806, who may have named the river for the nearby Native American village of Tualamne or Tautamne. This may in turn refer to the native word talmalamne, or "a group of stone huts or caves". Father Pedro Muñoz, a member of the 1806 expedition, noted in his diary that "we came upon a village called Tautamne. This village is situated on some steep precipices, inaccessible on account of their rough rocks. The Indians live in their sótanos [cellars or caves]". At this time, the Native American population along the lower Tuolumne and Stanislaus Rivers is believed to have been approximately two thousand.

Another possible origin of the name Tuolumne is the Central Sierra Miwok word taawalïmi, meaning "squirrel place", referring to a Native American village on the nearby Stanislaus River. The suffix -umne, which appears in the names of two other California rivers, the Mokelumne and Cosumnes, is thought to have meant "place of" or "people of" in the native language.

The Tuolumne River was the scene of significant gold mining activity during the California Gold Rush. The first known discovery of gold in the area was made by Benjamin Wood, a prospector from Oregon, in the summer of 1848. During the latter part of that year and early 1849, mining camps were established along the Tuolumne, including Jamestown, Tuttletown, Melones, Don Pedros Bar, and Shaws Flat. The following spring a party of Mexican miners from Sonora discovered an even richer deposit farther upstream, establishing Sonoranian Camp, predecessor of the present-day town of Sonora, California. By the end of 1849, there were over 10,000 miners in the Tuolumne River area, half of them in Sonora, which became the Tuolumne County seat in 1850.

Mining activity increased dramatically in the early 1850s, with prospectors pushing up into the foothills beyond Soulsbyville. In March 1850, an "enormously rich" deposit was discovered at Columbia. The same year, the Bonanza Mine near Sonora yielded a 1500-ounce nugget, the fourth largest ever discovered in California. (The largest was found in Carson Hill in Calaveras County, just north of the Tuolumne River watershed along the Stanislaus River, in 1854.) The prosperity in the region prompted a search for a new crossing of the Sierra Nevada that would provide more direct access to the camps from the east. The Clark-Skidmore Party made this crossing in 1852 via the upper Stanislaus River and the north fork of the Tuolumne. Parts of the route they established eventually formed the Walker River Trail, regarded as one of the more difficult of the main Sierra crossings.

For a brief period the lower Tuolumne became a major steamboat route, ferrying prospectors and supplies from Stockton. The unpredictable nature of the river made both navigating and crossing difficult, so starting in the Gold Rush era many ferries were established, one of the first at Dickenson's Ferry in the early 1850s. This particular location was the crossing of Fort Miller Road (Millerton Road), a major land trade route that connected Stockton with Millerton near present-day Fresno (today the site of the Millerton Lake reservoir).

By 1853, most of the easily mined gold had been exhausted, and hydraulic mining operations became the dominant extraction method. The Tuolumne County Water Company, first organized in 1851 to divert water from the Tuolumne River basin to the Stanislaus River, constructed a network of reservoirs, ditches and flumes initially used for mining and later for irrigation. The first dam on the Tuolumne River proper, near La Grange, was built in 1852 to divert water for hydraulic mining. Sediment and rocks washed down by hydraulic mining and sluicing operations accumulated along the lower Tuolumne, destroying native floodplain habitat and making much of the river unnavigable.

Irrigation, power and water supply

La Grange and Old Don Pedro Dams
After the gold rush many miners settled along the lower Tuolumne River as farmers. Ferry sites grew into lively towns, such as at Waterford, where a crossing had been established in 1866. The town of Tuolumne City was founded near the mouth of the Tuolumne as a port, but it soon became apparent that mining debris had made the river unsuitable for navigation, and the area was abandoned. In the mid-1860s Tuolumne City and Paradise (located about  further up the river) were reestablished as farming communities. The founding of Modesto in 1870, along a new railroad through the San Joaquin Valley, drew most of the population away from these towns and others along the Tuolumne. By the early 1900s Modesto's population numbered more than four thousand.

As it became apparent that the Central Valley's seasonal rainfall patterns made it unsuitable for dryland farming, farmers organized to build irrigation infrastructure along the Tuolumne River. Turlock Irrigation District (TID), established in 1887, was the first irrigation district in California, and the Modesto Irrigation District (MID) was established soon after in the same year. The two districts serve the south and north sides of the river, respectively. The dam diverted the river into canals that water most of the lower valley. The first TID farmers received water in 1900. The MID canal took a total of thirteen years to complete, with the first water deliveries on June 27, 1903.

As the population of the area grew, the Tuolumne River districts soon began to experience seasonal water shortages. The Dallas-Warner Reservoir (today's Modesto Reservoir) was completed in 1912 on the north side of the river, but was only considered a temporary solution. Construction on the first Don Pedro Dam began in 1921 to store floodwaters of the Tuolumne proper, allowing for the extension of the irrigation season and to provide water during dry years. Although the irrigation districts had the primary rights to the Tuolumne under the doctrine of prior appropriation, those rights could be relinquished under the "use it or lose it" rule, so storage had to be developed to enable the full beneficial use of river water. Named for the Gold Rush mining camp its reservoir submerged, the Don Pedro dam was completed in 1923, holding back  of water. In 1923 and 1924 both Don Pedro and La Grange dams were fitted for hydroelectric generation.

Hetch Hetchy Project
San Francisco did not move forward with plans to divert the Tuolumne until the 1906 San Francisco earthquake and subsequent fires devastated the city, proving the inadequacy of the existing water system. After exploring fourteen sites throughout Central California, San Francisco had settled on the Tuolumne's Hetch Hetchy Valley as the ideal location to develop storage and hydroelectric power. Because the area had been located inside Yosemite National Park since 1890, the city petitioned for Congress to pass the Raker Act. Signed in 1913 by President Woodrow Wilson, the Act allowed San Francisco to dam the Tuolumne River, as long as the water and power provided would be reserved exclusively for public utility, not private sale.

The Hetch Hetchy Valley became the center of the first major environmental controversy in the United States. John Muir, the leader of the Sierra Club, spearheaded a legal battle against the proposed O'Shaughnessy Dam, famously stating – "Dam Hetch Hetchy! As well dam for water-tanks the peoples' cathedrals and churches, for no holier temple has ever been consecrated by the heart of man." The Hetch Hetchy debacle is often credited with birthing modern environmentalism, sharply dividing the conservation movement – which favored the development of natural resources for public benefit – and the preservationists, who believed that sites of scenic value like Hetch Hetchy were better left for public recreation and enjoyment.

Despite the controversy, the city of San Francisco pushed through, beginning construction in early 1914 and filling the reservoir for the first time in May 1923. The Hetch Hetchy Railroad was built along  of the Tuolumne River Canyon to provide access to the remote construction site. Hydroelectric power reached San Francisco by 1925, but the first water was not delivered until 1934. Today, San Francisco diverts about 33 percent of the flow of the Tuolumne at Hetch Hetchy, or 14 percent of the river's total flow.

New Don Pedro Dam and modern development
By the mid 20th century it was clear that storage capacity in Tuolumne River reservoirs was insufficient to meet growing water demands. The irrigation dam at Don Pedro could only store enough water for a single growing season, allowing little carryover for drought years, and on the other hand providing very little flood control. In the late 1950s TID and MID began planning for a high dam on the Tuolumne River several miles below the existing Don Pedro Dam. In 1961 voters approved revenue bonds to fund the project. However, it took until 1966 for the Federal Power Commission (now FERC) to greenlight the project. Concerns that the new dam would impact king salmon populations were the primary cause of the delay.

Construction of the dam began in 1967 and the river was diverted in September 1968. The embankment was topped out on May 28, 1970, and the project was formally dedicated on May 22, 1971, after four years of construction and a total cost of over $110 million. It would be eleven years before the new reservoir of  – ten times the size of Old Don Pedro – filled completely in June 1982.

Dam proposals

Since the 1970s, the Turlock Irrigation District has proposed damming the Clavey River, a free-flowing tributary of the Tuolumne, to produce hydroelectricity. In 1994 the Federal Energy Regulatory Commission studied the project and determined that the benefits would not justify the financial and environmental costs.

Recreation
The Tuolumne River watershed receives over a million recreational visits each year, primarily to the protected wilderness areas of Yosemite National Park and to the difficult but popular whitewater on the Main Tuolumne and Cherry Creek.

The Tuolumne is considered a classic California whitewater run, and has been used recreationally since the 1960s. Several rafting companies serve the main Tuolumne, a Class IV+ (advanced) river with many rapids changing to Class V when the flow exceeds . The most difficult single rapids is Clavey Falls, located just above the Clavey River; the longest is Grey's Grindstone, at nearly a mile (1.6 km). Between these two rapids the swimming holes of the Clavey are a popular camping spot during the summer. The Cherry Creek is also run by commercial trips. It is considered one of the most difficult whitewater rivers in the entire United States, with fifteen Class V rapids. Both runs are dam controlled, which usually extends the rafting season through the dry late summer and fall.

In Yosemite National Park, the Grand Canyon of the Tuolumne (from Tuolumne Meadows to Hetch Hetchy Reservoir) was first kayaked in 1983. This  segment is rated Class IV-V+, with many waterfalls requiring a portage. In addition to being extremely difficult (if not borderline impossible at the aforementioned waterfalls) the water flow depends entirely on rain and snow melt, and the whitewater season can be extremely short during dry years. The general consensus is "that the best paddling in is the upper miles while the middle section is better for hikers and canyoneers."

The Clavey River, not being located in the national park, is open to public access, but due to its remoteness and difficulty (Class V+), and the short window of boatable spring runoff, it is only run by a handful of kayakers each year.

To protect the river, the U.S. Forest Service requires private trips to obtain a permit before floating the Tuolumne. Running the Tuolumne within Yosemite National Park was also in a legal gray zone until 2015, when the park opened the Tuolumne and Merced Rivers to limited paddling and rafting.

Wildfire 
In 2013, the Rim Fire burned 257,314 acres. This megafire was, at the time, California's third largest wildfire on record. This wildfire devastated habitat for many native and/or endangered species, and has impacted recreational opportunities, communities and economies alike.

Wild and Scenic designation
The Tuolumne River received the Wild and Scenic Rivers designation in 1984. The designated reach is “the main stem from its source to the Don Pedro Reservoir.” The system uses three classifications; Tuolumne has  categorized as Wild,  categorized as Scenic and  categorized as Recreational, for a total of  protected from further development.

See also
List of rivers of California
Roderick Nash
Tuolumne River Regional Park

References

Works cited

External links

 Informational Site about rafting on the Tuolumne River
 News and information about rafting the Tuolumne River
 Tuolumne Wild and Scenic River - BLM page
 The Tuolumne River Trust

 
Rivers of the Sierra Nevada (United States)
Tributaries of the San Joaquin River
Wild and Scenic Rivers of the United States
Rivers of Mariposa County, California
Rivers of Stanislaus County, California
Rivers of Tuolumne County, California
Rivers of Yosemite National Park
Geography of Modesto, California
Hetch Hetchy Project
Geography of the San Joaquin Valley
Stanislaus National Forest
Biosphere reserves of the United States
Rivers of Northern California
Rivers of the Sierra Nevada in California